Hajjiabad (also Romanized as Ḩājjīābād and Hājīābād) is a village in Khorram Rud Rural District, in the Central District of Tuyserkan County, Hamadan Province, Iran. As of the 2006 census, its population was 665, with 182 families.

References 

Populated places in Tuyserkan County